Kitty Smith Hayes (1928 – 17 May 2008) was a well-known concertina-player in Shanaway, Milltown Malbay, County Clare, Ireland.

Hayes was born in the townland of Fahanlunaghta, close to Lahinch. She was the daughter of Peter Smith, a locally well-known concertina player. Hayes started playing at a young age, attracted to the music played by her father. When she mastered the basics, Peter Smith bought her her own concertina. She started playing at local dances.

On one these local dances she met whistle and flute player Josie Hayes, who played in the Laichtín Naofa Céilí Band. They later married and raised seven children. Josie Hayes died in 1992. Hayes often played at Gleeson's Pub in Coore.

CDs
 Kitty Hayes: A touch of Clare
 Kitty Hayes and Peter Laban: They'll be good yet 

Compilation
 Around the Hills of Clare
 Keepers of Tradition Concertina players of County Clare

As a remembrance
 Kitty Hayes Remembered

References

External links
 

Musicians from County Clare
Concertina players
1920s births
Date of birth missing
2008 deaths
Place of death missing
People from Lahinch
People from Milltown Malbay